Jamie Hanford (born May 25, 1975) is an American lacrosse player who plays for the Rochester Knighthawks in the National Lacrosse League.  Known as a face-off specialist, he was acquired by the Titans as a free agent after playing five seasons with the Colorado Mammoth.

Hanford, named an All-American three times while at Loyola College in Maryland, was selected in the First Round (sixth overall) in the 1998 NLL entry draft.

Hanford has also played in the outdoor Major League Lacrosse.

Statistics

NLL

MLL

References

1975 births
Living people
American lacrosse players
Colorado Mammoth players
Lacrosse players from Connecticut
Loyola Greyhounds men's lacrosse players
Major League Lacrosse players
New York Titans (lacrosse) players
People from Darien, Connecticut
Philadelphia Wings players
Sportspeople from Fairfield County, Connecticut